Sadat-e Nejatollah (also Romanized as Sādāt-e Nejātollāh; also known as Al Sādāt-e Nejāt and Fech) is a village in Ahudasht Rural District, Shavur District, Shush County, Khuzestan Province, Iran. At the 2006 census, its population was 144, in 24 families.

References 

Populated places in Shush County